The Gladstein Fellowship is a program operated by the Jewish Theological Seminary allowing selected students of the seminary to serve in the capacity of rabbi of a selected congregation.

Congregations selected by JTS to benefit from the Gladstein Fellowship program are offered three Gladstein fellows each for a two-year period for a total of six years with the option of hiring any of the fellows to a permanent position. Gladstein fellows normally visit the congregations for which they are selected monthly, are available to congregants by phone and email at other times, and receive a stipend in exchange for their services.

History
The Gladstein Fellowship program was founded by Ned and Jane Gladstein in 2003. The first congregation to benefit from the program was Loudon Jewish Congregation in Leesburg, Virginia.

List of benefiting congregations

References

External links
General information and timeline of the Gladstein Fellowship

Conservative Judaism in the United States
Internship programs
Jewish education